The 2022–23 Quaid-e-Azam Trophy was a first-class domestic cricket competition that took place in Pakistan from 27 September to 30 November 2022. In September 2022, the Pakistan Cricket Board (PCB) confirmed the fixtures for the tournament. Khyber Pakhtunkhwa were the defending champions but did not qualify for the final.

The final of the tournament was  played from 26 to 30 November and Northern won their first title.

Squads
On 26 September 2022, the PCB confirmed all the squads for the tournament.

Venues

Points table

 The top 2 teams qualified for the Final

Fixtures

Round 1

Round 2

Round 3

Round 4

Round 5

Round 6

Round 7

Round 8

Round 9

Round 10

Final

External links
 Series home at PCB
 Series home at ESPN Cricinfo

References 

Domestic cricket competitions in 2022–23
2022 in Pakistani cricket
2022-23 Quaid-e-Azam Trophy
Pakistani cricket seasons from 2000–01